Boxed wine (cask wine) is wine sold in a bag inside a box. This box is made from cardboard or corrugated fiberboard, which supports the plastic bag filled with wine. The wine flows out from a plastic push-release valve.

History
The process for packaging 'cask wine' (boxed wine) was invented by Thomas Angove, a winemaker from Renmark, South Australia, and patented  by his company on April 20, 1964.  Polyethylene bladders of one gallon (4.5 litres) were placed in corrugated boxes for retail sale. The original design required that the consumer cut the corner off the bladder, pour out the serving of wine, and then reseal it with a special peg. This design was based on a product already on the market, a bag in a box used by mechanics to hold and transport battery acid.

In 1967, Australian inventor Charles Malpas and Penfolds Wines patented a plastic, air-tight tap welded to a metallised bladder, making storage more convenient. All modern wine casks now use plastic taps which can be exposed by tearing away a perforated panel on the box. For the following decades, 'bag in a box' packaging was primarily preferred by producers of less expensive wines, as they were cheaper to produce and distribute than glass flagons, which served a similar market.

In Australia, due to the difference in how wine is taxed compared to other alcoholic beverages, boxed wine is often the least expensive form of drinkable alcohol. These attributes have led to boxed wine being widely available throughout Australia and holding a prominent place in Australian pop culture.

During the mid-1970s, the bag-in-box packaging concept expanded to other beverages, including spring waters, orange juices, and wine coolers. Today, however, wine and spring water are the main two beverages packed into these bags.

In 2003, California Central Coast AVA based Black Box Wines introduced mass premium wines in a box. Within the decade, premium wineries and bottlers began packaging their own high-quality boxed wine. This, coupled with an increased cultural interest in environmentally sustainable packaging, has cultivated growing popularity with affluent wine consumers.

Attributes 
The Scandinavian state institutions Systembolaget and Vinmonopolet analyzed the environmental impact of various wine packaging in 2010. Bag-in-Box packaging was found to leave only 12% to 29% of the carbon footprint of bottled wine and was found to be superior by every other ecological criterion.

Tyler Colman from New York Times stated that bag-in-box is more environmentally friendly than bottled wine  as well as easier to transport and store. Typical bag-in-box containers hold one and a half to four 750 ml bottles of wine per box, though they come in a wide variety of volumes. Bag-in-box packaging is less expensive and lighter than glass-bottled wine.

The removal of wine from the flexible bag without adding air to fill the vacated space greatly reduces the oxidation of the wine during dispensing. Compared to bottled wine, which should be consumed within hours or days of opening, bag-in-box wine will not spoil for approximately 3–4 weeks after breaking the seal. In addition, it is not subject to cork taint. Wine contained in plastic bladders is not intended for cellaring and should be consumed within the manufacturer's printed shelf life. Deterioration may be noticeable 12 months after filling.

Colloquialisms 
In Australia, boxed wine is more commonly referred to by the colloquial name "goon". The cardboard box is referred to as a "goon box" and the bag within is referred to as a "goon bag".

The word goon is derived from the word flagon, which is a traditional vessel used for storing wine. An occasional Australian pronunciation of the word flagon placed emphasis on the second syllable such that flagon came to be pronounced as "fla-goon", which was then shortened to simply "goon".

See also

 Goon of Fortune
 Wine cask
 Flavored fortified wine
 Jug wine, inexpensive table wine

References

Australian inventions
Food storage containers
Wine packaging and storage
Wine styles
Wine terminology